Irina Safarova (born 19 June 1969) is a Russian long-distance runner. Safarova competed in the 1997, 1998, 2001, 2002 and 2004 IAAF World Half Marathon Championships, the 2002 European Athletics Championships (marathon), and the 2003 European Cross Country Championships.

She also won the 2000 Hong Kong Marathon (2:46:59), the 2001 California International Marathon (2:36:36), and the 2005 Country Music Marathon (2:33:53).

International competitions

Professional marathons

References

External links

marathoninfo

1969 births
Living people
Russian female long-distance runners
Russian female marathon runners
Russian female cross country runners
Russian Athletics Championships winners
20th-century Russian women
21st-century Russian women